Sarona Motlhagodi (17 May 1993 – 5 March 2021), known professionally as Sasa Klaas, was a Botswana singer, rapper, and songwriter. She was born on 17 May 1993  in Botswana and raised by a single mother and politician Anna Mokgethi. She was an all-round musician mostly known for her hip-hop. She made her debut with her hit single Mma Mongwato. She was in a relationship with Bakang Baxon Moitoi.

Career 
Sasa Klaas' career took off with A Ke Mo Khande  a collaboration with Scar. Soon after in 2011 she became a presenter of The Foundation: Next Level from 2011 to 2012 on e.tv Botswana. Her first solo single, Hadsan, was released.

Death 

She died on 5 March 2021 around 7pm at age 27 in a R44 helicopter crash in Xumabee Game Ranch (near Sojwe).

Discography

Singles 

 Mma Mongwato
 H.A.D.S.A.N
 Playing with Myself
 You
 The Best Things
 Vapors

 Bafana ba style

 Mosoroto

See also 

 Anna Mokgethi

 Vee Mampeezy
 Zeus
Ross Branch
Charma Gal

References 

Botswana women singers
1993 births
2021 deaths
21st-century women singers
Victims of aviation accidents or incidents in Botswana
Victims of helicopter accidents or incidents
Victims of aviation accidents or incidents in 2021
People from Gaborone